Bullshit (also bullshite or bullcrap) is a common English expletive which may be shortened to the euphemism bull or the initialism B.S. In British English, "bollocks" is a comparable expletive. It is mostly a slang term and a profanity which means "nonsense", especially as a rebuke in response to communication or actions viewed as deceptive, misleading, disingenuous, unfair or false. As with many expletives, the term can be used as an interjection, or as many other parts of speech, and can carry a wide variety of meanings. A person who excels at communicating nonsense on a given subject is sometimes referred to as a "bullshit artist" instead of a "liar."

In philosophy and psychology of cognition the term "bullshit" is sometimes used to specifically refer to statements produced without particular concern of truth, to distinguish from a deliberate, manipulative lie intended to subvert the truth. In business and management, guidance for comprehending, recognizing, acting on and preventing bullshit, are proposed for stifling the production and spread of this form of misrepresentation in the workplace, media and society. Within organizations bullshitting is considered to be a social practice that people engage with to become part of a speech community, to get things done in that community, and to reinforce their identity. Research has also produced the Organizational Bullshit Perception Scale (OBPS) that reveals three factors of organizational bullshit (regard for truth, the boss, and bullshit language) that can be used to gauge perceptions of the extent of organizational bullshit that exists in a workplace.

The word is generally used in a depreciatory sense, but it may imply a measure of respect for language skills or frivolity, among various other benign usages. In philosophy, Harry Frankfurt, among others, analyzed the concept of bullshit as related to, but distinct from, lying; the liar tells untruth, the bullshitter aims to convey a certain impression of themselves without being concerned about whether anything at all is true—it may be.

As an exclamation, "Bullshit!" conveys a measure of dissatisfaction with something or someone, but this usage need not be a comment on the truth of the matter.

Etymology
"Bull", meaning nonsense, dates from the 17th century, while the term "bullshit" has been used as early as 1915 in British and American slang, and came into popular usage only during World War II. The word "bull" itself may have derived from the Old French bole meaning "fraud, deceit". The term "horseshit" is a near synonym. An occasionally used South African English equivalent, though more common in Australian slang, is "bull dust".

Although there is no confirmed etymological connection, these older meanings are synonymous with the modern expression "bull", generally considered and used as a contraction of "bullshit".

Another proposal, according to the lexicographer Eric Partridge, is that the term was popularized by the Australian and New Zealand troops from about 1916 arriving at the front during World War I. Partridge claims that the British commanding officers placed emphasis on bull; that is, attention to appearances, even when it was a hindrance to waging war. The Diggers allegedly ridiculed the British by calling it bullshit.

In the philosophy of truth and rhetoric

Assertions of fact
"Bullshit" is commonly used to describe statements made by people concerned with the response of the audience rather than with truth and accuracy. On one prominent occasion, the word itself was part of a controversial advertisement. During the 1980 U.S. presidential campaign, the Citizens Party candidate Barry Commoner ran a radio advertisement that began with an actor exclaiming: "Bullshit! Carter, Reagan and Anderson, it's all bullshit!" NBC refused to run the advertisement because of its use of the expletive, but Commoner's campaign successfully appealed to the Federal Communications Commission to allow the advertisement to run unedited.

Harry Frankfurt's concept
In his essay On Bullshit (originally written in 1986, and published as a monograph in 2005), philosopher Harry Frankfurt of Princeton University characterizes bullshit as a form of falsehood distinct from lying. The liar, Frankfurt holds, knows and cares about the truth, but deliberately sets out to mislead instead of telling the truth. The "bullshitter", on the other hand, does not care about the truth and is only seeking to impress:

Frankfurt connects this analysis of bullshit with Ludwig Wittgenstein's disdain of "non-sense" talk, and with the popular concept of a "bull session" in which speakers may try out unusual views without commitment. He fixes the blame for the prevalence of "bullshit" in modern society upon anti-realism and upon the growing frequency of situations in which people are expected to speak or have opinions without appropriate knowledge of the subject matter.

Several political commentators have seen that Frankfurt's concept of bullshit provides insights into  political campaigns. Gerald Cohen, in "Deeper into Bullshit", contrasted the kind of "bullshit" Frankfurt describes with a different sort: nonsense discourse presented as sense. Cohen points out that this sort of bullshit can be produced either accidentally or deliberately. While some writers do deliberately produce bullshit, a person can also aim at sense and produce nonsense by mistake; or a person deceived by a piece of bullshit can repeat it innocently, without intent to deceive others.

Cohen gives the example of Alan Sokal's "Transgressing the Boundaries" as a piece of deliberate bullshit. Sokal's aim in creating it, however, was to show that the "postmodernist" editors who accepted his paper for publication could not distinguish nonsense from sense, and thereby by implication that their field was "bullshit".

David Graeber's theory of bullshit work in the modern economy
Anthropologist David Graeber's book Bullshit Jobs: A Theory argues the existence and societal harm of meaningless jobs. He contends that over half of societal work is pointless, which becomes psychologically destructive.

Education and reasoning as immunization against bullshit
Brandolini's law, also known as the “bullshit asymmetry principle,” holds that “the amount of energy needed to refute bullshit is an order of magnitude bigger than what’s needed to produce it.” This truism highlights that while the battle against misinformation more generally must be fought “face to face,” the larger war against belief in misinformation won’t be won without prevention. Once people are set in their ways, beliefs are notoriously hard to change. Building immunity against false beliefs in the first place is the more effective long-term strategy.

Almost 20 years before Dr. Frankfurt, NYU professor Neil Postman gave a talk entitled, “Bullshit and the Art of Crap Detection” at the 1969 National Convention for Teachers of English in Washington DC. He started by telling his audience that “helping kids to activate their crap-detectors should take precedence over any other legitimate educational aim."

University of Washington biologist Carl Bergstrom and professor Jevin West began a college course on "Calling Bullshit: Data Reasoning in a Digital World". They then launched the Calling Bullshit website and published a book with the same title.

As an object of psychological research

While Dr. Frankfurt sparked the academic study of bullshit and bullshitting, few have advanced our knowledge of “bullshittees”, those who consume bullshit, more than University of Regina psychology professor Dr. Gordon Pennycook. He and his colleagues won the 2016 Ig Nobel Prize (for Peace) for developing a questionnaire designed to quantify receptiveness to a particular kind of bullshit that they called “pseudoprofound bullshit."

Wake Forest University psychologists found evidence to support that beyond the Dunning-Kruger effect (unwarranted high self-confidence), bullshitting tends to happen when there’s social pressure to provide an opinion and a social “pass” that will allow someone to get away with it. Psychology research from Yale University demonstrated that the Dunning-Kruger effect is amplified by access to the internet: we tend to conflate the ability to look up information on the internet with actual personal knowledge. Social media also offers an environment that combines the social pressure to bullshit with an anonymity that provides the social “pass.” In 2018, education experts from Queen’s University in Belfast summed it up this way:  “…along with a pervasive and balkanized social media ecosystem and high internet immersion, public life provides abundant opportunities to bullshit and lie on a scale we could have scarcely credited 30 years ago.”

Psychologists at Vanderbilt University, Duke University and University of North Carolina researched the Illusory truth effect, or the tendency to believe false information to be correct after repeated exposure. The listener is likely to let it override their prior knowledge on the subject and believe it.

Research by psychologists at the University of Waterloo tested the familiar adage that “you can’t bullshit a bullshitter.” To do so, they explored correlations between a scale that measures “bullshitting” (the Bullshitting Frequency Scale or BFS) and a scale that measures “bullshit receptivity” (the Bullshit Receptivity Scale or BRS) and found that higher scores on the former were correlated with higher scores on the latter. In other words, those who are most likely to bullshit are in turn more likely to believe bullshit, suggesting that you can indeed bullshit a bullshitter after all.

In everyday language

Outside of the academic world, among natural speakers of North American English, as an interjection or adjective, bullshit conveys general displeasure, an objection to, or points to unfairness within, some state of affairs. This colloquial usage of "bullshit", which began in the 20th century, "bullshit" does not give a truth score to another's discourse. It simply labels something that the speaker does not like & feels he is unable to change.

In the colloquial English of the Boston, Massachusetts area, "bullshit" can be used as an adjective to communicate that one is angry or upset, for example, "I was wicked bullshit after someone parked in my spot".

In popular culture

 The Showtime TV series Penn & Teller: Bullshit! debunks many common beliefs and often criticizes specific people's comments. Penn Jillette stated the name was chosen because you could be sued for saying someone is a liar, but not if you said they were talking bullshit.
 A running joke in the Channel 4 series The Last Leg is that the host, Adam Hills, has a series of "bullshit buttons" on his desk that are pressed whenever an appropriate event occurs. Upon doing so, the speaker system will play the word "bullshit". These are normally programmed with the voices of celebrity guests, except for the "People's Bullshit Button", which is programmed with the collective voices of a past audience.
 Wooden versions of the Trammel of Archimedes are sold as novelty items under the name of bullshit grinders.

See also

 Buzzword bingo, also known as bullshit bingo
 Chicken shit
 Confabulation
 Fake news
 Gish gallop
 Holy cow
 Humbug
 Not even wrong
 Sacred cow
 Shibai
 Tall tale
 Waffle (speech)

References

Notes

Bibliography
 Eliot, T. S. (1997).  Inventions of the March Hare: Poems 1909–1917. Harcourt. 
  – Harry Frankfurt's detailed analysis of the concept of bullshit.
 
 Holt, Jim, Say Anything, one of his Critic At Large essays from The New Yorker, (August 22, 2005)
   – Halifax academic Laura Penny's study of the phenomenon of bullshit and its impact on modern society.
 Weingartner, C..  "Public doublespeak: every little movement has a meaning all of its own".  College English, Vol. 37, No. 1 (Sep., 1975), pp. 54–61.

Further reading

External links

 
 

English profanity
Feces
Interjections
Deception
English words